Mimomimiculus latefasciatus is a species of beetle in the family Cerambycidae, and the only species in the genus Mimomimiculus. It was described by Breuning in 1970.

References

Crossotini
Beetles described in 1970
Monotypic beetle genera